Bafia is a town in the Centre Province of Cameroon.

Bafia or Bavia may also refer to:

Bafia 
 Bafia languages, a node of Bantu languages.
 Bafia language, a Bantu language
 Bafia people, the Africans native to Bafia
 Cosmos de Bafia, a football club
 Tadeusz Bafia, a Polish skier
 The Bank and Financial Institution Act (BAFIA) in Nepalese law

Bavia 
 Bavia, a genus of jumping spiders
 Bavia, a Roman gente
 Luis de Bávia, a 17th-century Spanish writer